Cabbage tactics is a militarily swarming and overwhelming tactic used by the People's Liberation Army Navy to seize control of islands. It is a tactic to overwhelm and seize control of an island by surrounding and wrapping the island in successive layers of Chinese naval ships, China Coast Guard ships, and fishing boats and cut off the island from outside support.

Definition 
Cabbage tactics were first named by Rear Admiral Zhang Zhaozhong of the People's Liberation Army Navy (PLAN). It is a tactic to overwhelm and seize control of an island by surrounding and wrapping the island in successive layers of Chinese naval ships, China Coast Guard ships and fishing boats and cut-off the island from outside support. It has also been called small-stick diplomacy.

According to The New York Times Magazine, Zhang Zhaozhong "described a “cabbage strategy,” which entails surrounding a contested area with so many boats — fishermen, fishing administration ships, marine surveillance ships, navy warships — that “the island is thus wrapped layer by layer like a cabbage.”"

Ahmet Goncu, an associate professor at China's Xi'an Jiaotong-Liverpool University, stated: "Whenever there is a conflicted small island, the Chinese military and paramilitary forces are sent to overwhelm the islands and lay siege to the surrounding islands with military ships, fishing boats along with other kinds of paramilitary vessels." The layers of Chinese vessels block the entry or exit of any other country's navies, thus effectively isolating the island and bringing it under Chinese control. The strategy also involves the People's Armed Forces Maritime Militia, which includes fishermen, serving as a first line of defense. The goal of cabbage tactics is to create a layered envelopment of the target.

History 
Examples of Chinese cabbage tactics include the swarming of contested islands in the South China Sea, which also entailed the construction of artificial islands, and the occupation of disputed areas along the Sino-Indian border. Cabbage tactics has also been used to intimidate military vessels. For instance, in 2009 the American survey ship Impeccable encountered cabbage tactics from Chinese maritime forces.

In 2013, The New York Times Magazine published a multimedia feature piece exploring the South China Sea that covered the concept of cabbage tactics in depth.

Usage 
The usage of this tactic has been seen at:
 Scarborough Reef in the South China Sea from Philippines in 2012
 Ayungin Island in the Spratlys also from Philippines in 2013
 Vietnam's claimed EEZ was encroached by installing a CNOOC oil rig
 Pagasa Island in the South China Sea in 2019.

See also 
 China's salami slicing
 Grey-zone (international relations)
 Hybrid warfare

References 

Naval warfare tactics
People's Liberation Army Navy
China–Philippines relations
China–Vietnam relations